Turkey competed at the 1996 Summer Olympics in Atlanta, United States.

Medalists

Results by event

Archery
In its fourth Olympic archery competition, Turkey's women nearly earned two medals.  Elif Altınkaynak made it to the semifinals in the individual competition, and the women's team made it there in the team round.  However, the semifinals were as far as any Turkish archer got, and Altankaynak and the team both lost there and in the bronze medal matches.

Women's Individual Competition:
 Elif Altınkaynak → Bronze Medal Match, 4th place (4-2)
 Natalia Nasaridze → Round of 32, 21st place (1-1)
 Elif Ekşi → Round of 64, 47th place (0-1)

Men's Individual Competition:
 Okyay Küçükkayalar → Round of 64, 59th place (0-1)

Women's Team Competition:
 Altınkaynak, Nasaridze, and Ekşi → Bronze Medal Match, 4th place (2-1)

Athletics
Men's Decathlon 
 Alper Kasapoğlu
 Final Result — 7575 points (→ 29th place)

Women's Javelin Throw
 Aysel Taş
 Qualification — 57.86m (→ did not advance)

Women's Marathon
 Serap Aktaş — 2:36.14 (→ 23rd place)

Boxing
Men's Light Flyweight (– 48 kg)
Yaşar Giritli
 First Round — Lost to Somrot Kamsing (Thailand) on points (4-19)

Men's Bantamweight (– 54 kg)
Soner Karagöz
 First Round — Lost to István Kovács (Hungary), 3-15

Men's Featherweight (– 57 kg)
Serdar Yağlı
 First Round — Lost to Josian Lebon (Mauritius), 8-9

Men's Lightweight (– 60 kg)
Vahdettin İşsever
 First Round — Lost to Hocine Soltani (Algeria), 2-14

Men's Light Welterweight (– 63.5 kg)
Nurhan Süleymanoğlu
 First Round — Defeated Aboubacar Diallo (Guinea), 21-5 
 Second Round — Lost to Héctor Vinent (Cuba), 1-23

Men's Welterweight (– 67 kg)
Cahit Sürme
 First Round — Lost to Oleg Saitov (Russia), 1-11

Men's Middleweight (– 75 kg)
Malik Beyleroğlu → Silver Medal
 First Round — Bye 
 Second Round — Defeated Zsolt Erdel (Hungary), 9-8 
 Quarterfinals — Defeated Tomasz Borowski (Poland), 16-12 
 Semifinals — Defeated Mohamed Bahari (Algeria), 11-11 (referee decision)
 Final — Lost to Ariel Hernández (Cuba), 3-11

Men's Light Heavyweight (– 81 kg)
Yusuf Öztürk
 First Round — Lost to Pedro Aurino (Italy), 7-15

Swimming
Men's 400m Freestyle
 Can Ergenekan
 Heat — 4:02.39 (→ did not advance, 27th place)

Men's 100m Backstroke
 Derya Büyükunçu
 Heat — 56.71 (→ did not advance, 20th place)

Men's 200m Backstroke
 Derya Büyükuncu
 Heat — 2:04.28 (→ did not advance, 21st place)

Men's 100m Butterfly
 Derya Büyükuncu
 Heat — 54.89 (→ did not advance, 27th place)

Men's 200m Butterfly
 Can Ergenekan
 Heat — 2:01.65 (→ did not advance, 27th place)

Women's 100m Butterfly
 Nida Zuhal
 Heat — 1:04.11 (→ did not advance, 35th place)

Women's 200m Butterfly
 Nida Zuhal
 Heat — 2:18.46 (→ did not advance, 26th place)

Weightlifting
Men's Light-Heavyweight (– 83 kg)
Dursun Sevinç
 Final — 165.0 + 197.5 = 362.5 (→ 7th place)

References

Nations at the 1996 Summer Olympics
1996
1996 in Turkish sport